Eugene Miltern (or Milton) Verell (November 26, 1859 - April 30, 1921) was a Democratic member of the Mississippi House of Representatives, representing Chickasaw County, from 1916 to 1920.

Biography 
Eugene Miltern Verrell was born on November 26, 1859, in Webster County, Mississippi. His parents were Charles Edward Verell and Leah Malindy (Terry) Verrell. He married Susan Middleton in 1885. He was elected to the Mississippi House of Representatives, representing Chickasaw County as a Democrat, in November 1915. He died on April 30, 1921, in Chick, Mississippi, and was buried in Houston, Mississippi.

References 

1859 births
1921 deaths
People from Houston, Mississippi
People from Webster County, Mississippi
Democratic Party members of the Mississippi House of Representatives